The Hanlon Ministry was a ministry of the Government of Queensland and was led by Labor Premier Ned Hanlon. It succeeded the Cooper Ministry on 7 March 1946 following Frank Cooper's resignation from the Ministry. The ministry was followed by the Gair Ministry on 17 January 1952 following Hanlon's death in office two days earlier.

First ministry
On 7 March 1946, the Governor, Sir Leslie Orme Wilson, designated 10 principal executive offices of the Government, appointed Harold Collins to the Executive Council to fill the vacancy left by Cooper's resignation, and appointed the following Members of the Legislative Assembly of Queensland to the Ministry as follows:

Second ministry
On 15 May 1947, following the state election, the Governor, Sir John Lavarack, designated 10 principal executive offices of the Government, appointed William Power and Jack Duggan to the Executive Council to fill the vacancy left by Walsh's loss of his parliamentary seat and Williams's retirement, and appointed the following Members of the Legislative Assembly of Queensland to the Ministry as follows:

Third ministry
On 10 May 1950, following the state election, the Governor, Sir John Lavarack, designated 10 principal executive offices of the Government, appointed Paul Hilton to the Executive Council to fill the vacancy left by Bruce's loss of his parliamentary seat, and appointed the following Members of the Legislative Assembly of Queensland to the Ministry as follows. The ministry lasted until 17 January 1952, at which time the Gair Ministry was sworn in.

Notes

References
 
 
 
 
 
 

Queensland ministries
Australian Labor Party ministries in Queensland